Christmas Lilies of the Field is a 1979 made-for-TV sequel to the classic 1963 film Lilies of the Field. In this sequel, directed by Ralph Nelson (his final project before his death), Homer Smith (played by Billy Dee Williams instead of Sidney Poitier) returns to the Arizona desert where he had built the chapel for the nuns. This time, Mother Maria (played by Maria Schell) convinces Homer Smith into building a kindergarten as well as an orphanage by claiming that, since the chapel lacks a bell-tower and bells, the previous job was never completed.

Plot

Cast
 Billy Dee Williams as Homer Smith
 Maria Schell as Mother Maria
 Fay Hauser as Janet Owens
 Lisa Mann as Sister Gertrude
 Hanna Hertelendy as Sister Albertine
 Judith Piquet as Sister Agnes 
 Donna Johnston as Sister Elizabeth
 Robert Hastings as Harold Pruitt
 Fred Hart as Father Brian Connor
 Oliver Nguyen as Trang (orphan)

Production
Parts of the film were shot in Salt Lake City and Orem, Utah.  The TV special was released on VHS in 1989.

References

External links
 
 Yahoo! TV
 Movies.go.com

1979 television films
1979 films
1970s Christmas films
1979 drama films
American Christmas films
Color sequels of black-and-white films
Films about Catholic nuns
Films about Catholicism
Films based on American novels
Films directed by Ralph Nelson
Films set in Arizona
NBC network original films
Television sequel films
Christmas television films
Films shot in Utah